Phạm Thanh Ngân (born 18 April 1939 in Phú Bình District in Thái Nguyên Province), is a former MiG-21 pilot of the Vietnamese People's Air Force. Phạm Thanh Ngân flew with the 921st Fighter Regiment and tied for second-most kills (with Nguyễn Hồng Nhị and Mai Văn Cường) amongst Vietnam War fighter aces at eight.

Phạm Thanh Ngân was admitted to the Communist Party of Vietnam on 8 December 1963  and became officially party member on 8 September 1964.

The following aerial-victories claims include the kills known to be credited to him by the VPAF:
 14 December 1966, Ryan 147 Firebee/Lightning Bug drone;
 16 September 1967, a US Air Force RF-101C Voodoo (serial number 56-0180, 20th Tactical Reconnaissance Squadron/432nd TRW; pilot Bagley, POW);
 03 October 1967, a USAF F-4D Phantom II (pilot Moore/WSO Gulbrandson, both rescued; a shared kill with Nguyễn Ngọc Độ);
 07 October 1967, a USAF F-4D Phantom II (pilot Appleby, POW/WSO Austin, KIA, US-side claims SAM);
 18 November 1967, a USAF F-105F Wild Weasel (pilot Dardeau, POW/EWO Lehnhoff, KIA);
 20 November 1967, a USAF F-105D Thunderchief (pilot Butler, POW);
 03 February 1968, a USAF F-102A Delta Dagger (pilot Wiggins, KIA).

See also
List of Vietnam War flying aces
Weapons of the Vietnam War

References

Bibliography

1939 births
North Vietnamese military personnel of the Vietnam War
Living people
People from Thái Nguyên province
North Vietnamese Vietnam War flying aces
Members of the 8th Politburo of the Communist Party of Vietnam
Members of the 7th Central Committee of the Communist Party of Vietnam
Members of the 8th Central Committee of the Communist Party of Vietnam